Sam Houser (born 1971) is a British video game producer. He is the co-founder and president of Rockstar Games and one of the creative driving forces behind the games in the Grand Theft Auto franchise, being producer since the third game.

Early life
Sam Houser was born in London in 1971. He is the son of solicitor Walter Houser and actress Geraldine Moffat, and brother to Dan Houser. Sam drew inspiration from crime films at an early age because his mother was an actress in that genre of film. As a child, The Getaway was Sam's main source of inspiration to become an aspiring "bank robber". Games like Elite and Mr. Do! were Sam's favourite games growing up. Elite was a "space mugger" game according to Sam, allowing him to explore his "bad boy" side at an early age.

Career
Houser joined Bertelsmann Music Group in 1990, working in the company's post-room. In 1994, Houser was named to BMG's new interactive entertainment division. By 1996, Houser became Head of Development at BMG Interactive.

Sam became a video producer for BMG Interactive after he and his father had lunch with the executive producer of the music label, who claimed that Houser had some good ideas. After BMG partnered with a small CD ROM company, Sam transferred to the Interactive Publishing division of BMG in order to work closely with developing video games.

Credited as executive producer, Houser is also the creator of several of the games in the Grand Theft Auto series with his brother Dan. On Grand Theft Auto III his responsibilities were, in his words, to be "militant on ensuring the game had a look, a sound, a story and a feel that worked." His description of the series as a whole is that the three sixth-generation Grand Theft Auto games form a "trilogy, [featuring] our distorted look at the East Coast around the time of the millennium (Grand Theft Auto III), followed by our reinterpretation of '80s Miami (Vice City), and lastly, our look at early-'90s California (San Andreas)."

Despite their status as creators of Grand Theft Auto, one of the most successful video game franchises of all-time, Houser and his brother Dan have shied away from the media spotlight, focusing instead on the Rockstar Games brand, rather than any one person getting the credit for the games' success. In 2009, both Sam and Dan Houser appeared in Time magazine's 100 most influential people of 2009 list. Houser also produced Max Payne 3 and Grand Theft Auto V.

Houser was portrayed by Daniel Radcliffe in the 2015 television film The Gamechangers.

Personal life
Houser became an American citizen in 2007. He lives in Brooklyn, New York City.

Executive producer
Grand Theft Auto (1997)
Body Harvest (1998)
Space Station Silicon Valley (1998)
Grand Theft Auto: London 1969 (1999)
Grand Theft Auto 2 (1999)
Grand Theft Auto III (2001)
Grand Theft Auto: Vice City (2002)
Manhunt (2003)
Grand Theft Auto: San Andreas (2004)
Grand Theft Auto: Liberty City Stories (2005)
The Warriors (2005)
Grand Theft Auto: Vice City Stories (2006)
Bully (2006)
Manhunt 2 (2007)
Grand Theft Auto IV (2008)
Grand Theft Auto: The Lost and Damned (2009)
Grand Theft Auto: The Ballad of Gay Tony (2009)
Red Dead Redemption (2010)
L.A. Noire (2011)
Max Payne 3 (2012)
Grand Theft Auto V (2013)
Red Dead Redemption 2 (2018)

Voice acting roles
Grand Theft Auto III (2001) – AmmuNation Clerk
Grand Theft Auto: San Andreas (2004) – Gangster (credited)
Grand Theft Auto IV (2008)

References

Bibliography

External links
 

1971 births
Academy of Interactive Arts & Sciences Hall of Fame inductees
Alumni of the University of Cambridge
BAFTA winners (people)
British emigrants to the United States
Living people
People educated at St Paul's School, London
Rockstar Games
Video game producers